Yeniköprü is a village in the Ahlat District of Bitlis Province in Turkey. Its population is 974 (2021).

References

Villages in Ahlat District